The men's 400 metres at the 2017 Asian Athletics Championships was held on 6 and 7 July.

Medalists

Results

Heats
Qualification rule: First 3 in each heat (Q) and the next 4 fastest (q) qualified for the semifinals.

Semifinals

Qualification rule: First 3 in each semifinal (Q) and the next 2 fastest (q) qualified for the final.

Final

References

400
400 metres at the Asian Athletics Championships